A Captive market is a market where the potential consumers face a severely limited number of competitive suppliers; their only choices are to purchase what is available or to make no purchase at all.  The term therefore applies to any market where there is a monopoly or oligopoly.

Examples of captive-market environments include the food markets in cinemas, airports, and sports arenas, college textbooks, US cable companies, the Kosher food market in the United Kingdom, printer refills, truck stops due to fueling contracts and semi truck regulations, and phone calls and food in jails and prisons. Academic publishers, such as Elsevier, operate captive markets. Professional team sports have often been described as an example of captive markets, with strict self-policing rules amongst supporters making it virtually impossible for fans to switch allegiances, and unwritten conduct rules dictating that official club merchandise should normally be worn to games by a majority of fans, allowing the teams themselves to raise prices as high as they feel like knowing that their supporters have little choice but to keep buying.

See also 
 Captive audience
Right to repair

References 

Market (economics)